South Shields Town Hall is a Grade II listed building on Westoe Road in South Shields, Tyne and Wear, England. It serves as the headquarters of South Tyneside Council.

The Old Town Hall

The first town hall in South Shields was commissioned as a manorial courthouse by the Dean and Chapter of Durham in the Market Place in 1768. The design included arcading on the ground floor to allow markets to be held, steps leading to a door on the first floor on the north side and Venetian windows on the first floor on the other sides. At roof level there is a square timber turret with a cupola. Following incorporation as a municipal borough in September 1850, the new civil leaders at South Shields Corporation acquired the building for use as a town hall in 1855.

The new Town Hall
After the first town hall was deemed inadequate in the 1890s, civic leaders decided to procure new premises. The site selected was a piece of open land at the corner of Bent House Lane (later known as Beach Road) and Westoe Road. The foundation stone for the new building was laid in 1905. It was designed by Ernest Fatch in the Edwardian Baroque style, was built at a cost of £78,000 and was officially opened by the Mayor,  George Thomas Grey, on 19 October 1910.

The design involved a symmetrical main frontage with thirteen bays facing onto Westoe Road with the end bays projected forward as pavilions; the central section of three bays, which also projected forward, featured a doorway with a stone surround on the ground floor, a round headed window on the first floor flanked by paired Ionic order columns with a broken pediment above. Above the pediment was a seated figure supported by two reclining figures. A main bell and four quarter bells were installed in the clock tower to play the Westminster Quarters. A statue by Albert Toft depicting Queen Victoria was erected outside the town hall on 7 May 1913.

Queen Elizabeth II, accompanied by the Duke of Edinburgh, visited the town hall on 29 October 1954. In order to provide additional office space, a modern extension along Beach Road was opened by the mayor, Alderman Jack Richardson, on 19 October 1960.

The building continued to serve as the headquarters of South Shields Borough Council and remained the local seat of government after the enlarged South Tyneside Council was formed in 1974. Statues by the sculptor, Roger Andrews, depicting Private Thomas Young VC and Lieutenant Richard Annand VC, who served with the Durham Light Infantry in the First World War and the Second World War respectively, were unveiled inside the town hall in May 2007.

Notes

References

Government buildings completed in 1910
City and town halls in Tyne and Wear
Grade II listed buildings in Tyne and Wear
Buildings and structures in South Shields